Oxana Guseva is a Paralympic swimmer from Russia competing mainly in category S7 events.

Career 
Oxana competed in both the 2004 and 2008 Summer Paralympics winning a solitary silver medal.  It was in 2004 she won that medal in the 400m freestyle behind Australia's Chantel Wolfenden who swam a new games record, she also finished sixth in the 100m freestyle, eighth in the 50m butterfly, fourth in the 200m individual medley but failed to make the final of the 100m freestyle and was part of the Russian team that finished fourth in the 4 × 100 m medley just 0.12 seconds behind the bronze medal-winning Australian team. At the 2008 games she again swam in the 400m freestyle but this time could only manage sixth, she also finished eighth in the 100m freestyle, eighth in the 50m butterfly and sixth in the individual medley.

References

External links
 

Paralympic swimmers of Russia
Swimmers at the 2004 Summer Paralympics
Swimmers at the 2008 Summer Paralympics
Paralympic silver medalists for Russia
Russian female butterfly swimmers
Russian female freestyle swimmers
Russian female medley swimmers
Living people
Medalists at the 2004 Summer Paralympics
S7-classified Paralympic swimmers
Year of birth missing (living people)
Medalists at the World Para Swimming Championships
Medalists at the World Para Swimming European Championships
Paralympic medalists in swimming
21st-century Russian women